Lee Patrick may refer to:
Lee Patrick (actress) (1901–1982), American theater and film actress
Lee Patrick (saxophonist) (born 1938), American saxophonist and university music instructor

See also 
Patrick Lee (disambiguation)